Jacqueline Comes Home is a Filipino crime biographical film starring Meg Imperial and Donnalyn Bartolome playing the roles of Marijoy and Jacqueline Chiong and Ryan Eigenmann as Sonny, the ring leader of the rape and murder. This movie is Alma Moreno's first produced by Viva Films outside of her home studio Regal Films.

The film is about the controversial Chiong murder case. On the night of July 16, 1997, sisters Marijoy (Donnalyn Bartolome) and Jacqueline (Meg Imperial) Chiong were abducted at a mall on Ayala Center Cebu in Cebu City. There, the sisters were gang raped and Marijoy was found dead in a ravine in Carcar, Cebu. However, Jacqueline was never found. The suspects would include Paco Larranaga, who is not portrayed in the film. Rodney Torres did a photo shoot for Meg Imperial and Donnalyn Bartolome for the film in Manila.

Cast 
Meg Imperial as Jacqueline Chiong
Donnalyn Bartolome as Marijoy Chiong
Alma Moreno as Thelma Chiong
Joel Torre as Dionisio Chiong
Ryan Eigenmann as Sonny (ring leader)

References

External links
 

2018 films
Philippine biographical films
Philippine crime films
Viva Films films
2010s biographical films
2018 crime films
Filipino-language films